Julian Roosevelt Pittman (born May 22, 1975) is a former professional American football defensive end in the National Football League. He played with the New Orleans Saints in 1998.

In the beginning of his senior year in September 1997, Pittman was charged with burglary and theft when he allegedly broke into a girlfriend's apartment, and as a result he was given a 30-day jail sentence and five years of probation, as well a suspension from Florida State. However, he was later reinstated and played the last four games of the 1997 season, including the Sugar Bowl.

In May 1998, he allegedly committed sexual battery in a bar in Tallahassee, which constituted a probation violation. Facing potentially three and a half years in prison, he was instead ordered to pay a $5,000 fine and perform 500 hours of community service.

Pittman is married to former Lauren Nicole Wride since 2010, and resides in Winter Garden, Florida.

References

External links
Pro-Football reference

1975 births
Living people
Florida State Seminoles football players
New Orleans Saints players
People from Niceville, Florida
People from Winter Garden, Florida
Players of American football from Florida